This is a list of Ministries of the Soviet Union.

List

O 
 Ministry of Oil and Gas Industry of the USSR (Minneftegazprom) (1989—1991)
 Ministry of Oil Industry of the USSR (Minnefteprom) (1948—1957); (1970—1989)
 Ministry of Oil Industry of the USSR (Minnefteprom) (1965—1970)
 Ministry of Oil Refining and Petrochemical Industry of the USSR (Minneftekhimprom) (1965 — 27.06.1989)
 Ministry of Petroleum Industry of the Eastern USSR (1946—1948)
 Ministry of Petroleum Industry of the South and West of the USSR (1946—1948)

P 
 Ministry of the Paper and Woodworking Industry of the USSR (1954—1957)
 Ministry of Paper and Wood Processing Industry of the USSR (1951—1953)
 Ministry of Power Engineering of the USSR (Minenergomash) (1975—1987)
 Ministry of Power Stations of the USSR (1946—1953); (1954—1958)
 Ministry of Power and Electrical Industries of the USSR (1953—1954)
 Ministry of Procurement of the USSR (1946—1953); (1953—1956); (1969—1985)
 Ministry of Production of Mineral Fertilizers of the USSR (Minudobreniy) (1980—1989)
 Ministry of Public Order of the USSR (MOOP) (26 July 1966 — 25 November 1968)
 Ministry of Pulp and Paper Industry of the USSR  (1968—1980)
 Ministry of Pulp and Paper Industry of the USSR (1946—1948)

R 
 Ministry of Radio Industry of the USSR (Minradioprom) (1965—1991)
 Ministry of Radioengineering Industry of the USSR (1954—1957)
 Ministry of Railways of the USSR (MPS) (1946—1992)
 Ministry of Road Transport and Highways of the USSR (Minavtoshoshdor) (1953—1956)
 Ministry of Automobile Transport of the USSR (Minavtotrans) (1952—1953)
 Ministry of the Rubber Industry of the USSR (Minrezinprom) (1947—1948)
 Ministry of the River Fleet of the USSR  (Mirechflot) (1946—1953); (1954—1956)
 Ministry of Rural Construction of the USSR (Minselstroy) (1953); (1967—1985)

S 
 Ministry of Shipbuilding Industry of the USSR (Minsudprom) (1946—1953); (1954—1957); (1965—1991)
 Ministry of Special Construction and Assembly Works of the USSR (1991)
 Ministry of State Control of the USSR (1946—1957)
 Ministry of State Farms of the USSR (1947—1953); (1953—1957)
 Ministry of State Food and Material Reserves (1948—1951)
 Ministry of State Security of the USSR (MGB) (1946—1953)

T 
 Ministry of Textile Industry of the USSR (Mintekstilprom) (1946—1948); (1955—????)
 Ministry of Technical Cultures of the USSR (1946—1947)
 Ministry of Trade of the USSR (Mintorg) (1946—1953); (1953—1958); (1965—1991)
 Ministry of Tractor and Agricultural Machinery of the USSR (Minselkhozmash, MTiSKHM SSSR (1955—1957); (1965—1987)
 Ministry of Transport Engineering of the USSR (Mintransmash) (1946—1953); (1954—1957)
 Ministry of Transport and Heavy Machine Building of the USSR (1953—1954)
 Ministry of Transport Construction of the USSR (Mintransstroy) (1954—1963); (1965—1991)

U 
 Ministry of Urban and Rural Construction of the USSR (Mingorselstroy) (1954—1957)
 Ministry of Urban Construction of the USSR (1949—1951)

W 
 Ministry of Water Construction of the USSR (1989—1990)

Other agencies under the Cabinet of Ministers

References

External links
 

 
Ministries of the Soviet Union
Lists of government ministries